Mark Hall (17 May 1936 – 18 November 2011) was a British producer and animator who co-founded Cosgrove Hall Productions and CHF Entertainment, with Brian Cosgrove. Together, they created multiple animated series, including Danger Mouse and Count Duckula.

Hall died of cancer in 2011, leaving his role in CHF Entertainment to his son Simon.

References

1936 births
2011 deaths
British animators
British animated film producers